Eucalyptus eugenioides, commonly known as the thin-leaved stringybark or white stringybark, is a species of tree endemic to eastern Australia. It is a small to medium-sized tree with rough stringy bark, lance-shaped to curved adult leaves, Flower buds in groups of between nine and fifteen, white flowers and hemispherical fruit.

Description
Flowering occurs from July to January.

Taxonomy
Eucalyptus eugenioides was first formally described in 1827 by Kurt Sprengel from an unpublished description by Franz Sieber and the description was published in Sprengel's book, Systema Vegetabilium. The species name refers to its perceived similarity to trees of the genus Eugenia. The term "stringybark" refers to the long, thin bark fibres that can be pulled off the tree trunk in strings.

Distribution and habitat
The thin-leaved stringybark is found across eastern New South Wales from Wyndham north to the vicinity of Warwick in southeastern Queensland with scattered populations further north as far as Gladstone. It is a common tree of shale- and slate-derived, moderately fertile soils in lowlands and low hills. It grows in open forest with other trees such as grey box (E. moluccana), forest red gum (E. tereticornis), cabbage gum (E. amplifolia), manna gum (E. viminalis), woollybutt (E. longifolia), narrow-leaved ironbark (E. crebra), and argyle apple (E. cinerea), spotted gum (Corymbia maculata), and with paperbark species such as prickly paperbark (Melaleuca styphelioides) and white feather honeymyrtle (M. decora). The thin-leaved stringybark is one of the key canopy species of the threatened Cumberland Plain Woodlands.

Ecology
The thin-leaved stringybark regenerates by regrowing from epicormic buds after bushfire and can live for more than a hundred years. The longhorn beetle species Adrium artifex has been recorded from the thin-leaved stringybark.

Cultivation
Eucalyptus eugenioides has been grown in California, where it grows best in coastal areas. In New South Wales, it is also known as "good kind stringybark" by beekeepers as the bees feeding on it are healthy and produce honey with a well-balanced amino-acid profile. It also provides the last crop of pollen before winter.

References

eugenioides
Myrtales of Australia
Flora of New South Wales
Flora of Queensland
Trees of Australia
Plants described in 1827